The Performing Musicians Association of Nigeria Rivers State Branch (PMAN Rivers State Branch) is an organization existing to promote the music profession and oversee the welfare of musicians in Rivers State, Nigeria. It is the state affiliate of the national Performing Musicians Association of Nigeria (PMAN). Its state headquarters are in Port Harcourt.

History
Founded in 1995, Geraldo Pino, a musician from Enugu led the association until 2004. He was succeeded by Muma Gee who became the first elected female chairman, but was later "impeached for misappropriation of funds and lack of accountability." In 2010, Lexy M assumed leadership of the association. He served until 2013 when succeeded by Lady IB, the second woman to hold the position.

Leadership
As of 2013, the executive board of the organization includes:
Chairman
Vice-chairman 1
Vice chairman 2
Publicity secretary
Treasurer
Provost

List of chairmen
The following is a list of past and present chairs of PMAN Rivers State Branch:
Geraldo Pino
Muma Gee
Arthur W. Pepple, Jr.
Peterstone Cole
Lekara "Lexy" Mueka (aka Lexy M)
Lady IB

See also
Music of Port Harcourt

References

Music in Port Harcourt
Organizations based in Rivers State
Organizations established in 1995
Music organizations based in Nigeria
1995 establishments in Nigeria
1990s establishments in Rivers State